The Nur Mountains ("Mountains of Holy Light"), formerly known as Alma-Dağ, the ancient Amanus, medieval Black Mountain, or Jabal al-Lukkam in Arabic, is a mountain range in the Hatay Province of south-central Turkey, which starts south of the Taurus Mountains (and is linked with it), south of the Ceyhan river (old name: Pyramus), runs roughly parallel to the Gulf of İskenderun (old name: Gulf of Issus) (İskenderun was called Alexandria of Cilicia) and ends in the Mediterranean coast between the Gulf of İskenderun and the Orontes (Asi) river mouth.

Geography

The highest peak is Bozdağ Dağı. A major pass through the mountains known as the Belen Pass (Syrian Gates) is located near the town of Belen. Another pass known as the Amanic Gates (Bahçe Pass) lies farther north.

Monasticism in the Black Mountain

The specific term "Mount Amanus" is referred to by ancient writers. In the Middle Ages, it was called the Black Mountain in Byzantine Greek, Armenian, Syriac and Latin. While monks had been leading a solitary life in the mountains since the fourth century, it was during the 10th and 11th century that the area became a major monastic hub for Byzantine monasticism, in its importance for the Byzantine East comparable to the influence of Athos in the Byzantine West. There were numerous Armenian, Melkite, Jacobite, Georgian, and Catholic monasteries and hermits in the mountains. On account of this, it was called Gâvur Dağ (Mount of Infidels) by the Turks. In 1028, the Emperor Romanos III, disturbed by the number of "heretical" (i.e., Syriac and Armenian) monks in the Black Mountain, tried to draft them for his campaign against Aleppo. In the 1050s the famous physician Ibn Butlan, who later would himself become a monk in Antioch, was impressed by the general health of monasticism in the region and especially of the monastery of St Simeon the Younger. In 1066, the monasteries were devastated by Afshin Bey who killed many monks. In 1098, the monks gave provisions to the Crusader army besieging Antioch. The monasteries were plundered again after the Battle of Ager Sanguinis in 1119 and many monks slain.

See also
Nikon of the Black Mountain

References

Mountain ranges of Turkey
Mountains associated with Byzantine monasticism
Mountains associated with Christian monasticism
Landforms of Hatay Province
Important Bird Areas of Turkey